Jeff Duncan may refer to:

 Jeff Duncan (politician) (born 1966), U.S. representative from South Carolina
 Jeff Duncan (musician), heavy metal guitarist
 Jeff Duncan (baseball) (born 1978), New York Mets outfielder

See also
 Geoff Duncan (born 1975), American politician, lieutenant governor of the U.S. state of Georgia